Odderøya is an island and neighborhoods in Kristiansand municipality in Agder county, Norway. The  island lies immediately to the south of the city centre of Kristiansand and it is connected to the mainland by four bridges.  The island creates a natural division between the eastern and western parts of the port of Kristiansand.

Gravanekanalen canal separates Odderøya from the city center and the fish wharf (Fiskebrygga). Prior to 1993, the island was owned by the Norwegian government and it was used as a naval base and training grounds, but since that time, the municipality of Kristiansand has taken over and is now using it for recreational purposes.  The island is mostly undeveloped, but the town development plan does include an area on the island for up to 500 homes.

History 

There are signs of ancient human activity on Odderøya. At Bendiksbukta, a dagger, an ax, and other tools of flint dating back to the Stone Age (Around the year 1000 BC) have been found.  On Odderøya, there are many interesting traces of military activity.  Within this defined geographic area, there are military fortifications stretching from the Great Northern War to the end of the Cold War. Key tracks from the battle of 9 April 1940 (Operation Weserübung) are partially visible. There has been military activity on Odderøya from 1667 until 1999, when the fortress was phased out.

The quarantine station or lazaretto at Odderøya was the largest in Northern Europe and was in operation from 1804 to 1914.  In 1804, it was a quarantine station for all of Denmark-Norway and Holstein. The quarantine station was for ships where plague (disease) had spread aboard the ship.  In connection with quarantine operations, the island also began to need its own cemetery, nicknamed the Cholera Cemetery. It is located at Kjerregårdsbukta.  The quarantine station was separated from the rest of the island with a high wall that runs from the height of Lasaretthøyden  to Bendiksbukta. It was built in the years 1800 to 1807 and is under restoration.

At times, Odderøya has been closed to the public due to military activity. There are a large number of former gun emplacements around the island from varying periods of time for cannons, machine guns, and mortars.  Most recently, the island was closed to the public from 1940 until 23 June 1992, after the Odderøya Fort was closed.  Since the municipality took over the island, it has been a popular excursion and hiking area.

World War II 

At 9 April 1940, eight Norwegian soldiers lost their lives in the battle against German aircraft and warships during the invasion of Norway in Operation Weserübung at Odderøya Fortress. The fortress returned the fire from the German warships and attacks by Luftwaffe bombers. The attackers of Kristiansand and Arendal consisted of the light cruiser Karlsruhe, three torpedo boats, and seven smaller vessels, one mothership, and around 1,000 soldiers. Three times between 5:00 and 7:00 in the morning, the German forces tried to penetrate and to put troops ashore, but whenever they chose to turn because of shelling from Odderøya. One of the shells from Karlsruhe missed the fortress. By accident this shell hit the upper part of Kristiansand Cathedral's church tower. In addition to the shell hits at the fortress, a bombshell led to an explosion at the ammunition depot. Bombs from planes hit both the fortress and civilian neighborhoods of the city, and the planes were shot at by anti-aircraft guns on board the Norwegian destroyer HNoMS Gyller which was present in Kristiansand harbor.  Several fires occurred where the bombs hit. At ten o'clock in the morning, the commander at the cruiser decided to break through whatever the resistance would be. Meanwhile, defenders at Odderøya got confusing orders not to fire on British or French warships. When the German force attacked again, one of the signal flags was confused with a French flag, and therefore the fire from the fortress was withheld. When the force was landed, it met no resistance, and the Norwegian commander surrendered the fortress. One of the anchors of the German merchant ship MS Seattle (1928) is exhibited by the Western battery of the fortress. During the battle the ship came under crossfire, was hit and sank.

The coordinated invasion of several cities started the former neutral Norway's participation in World War II on the Allied side.
In the later years of the war, many of the guns were taken out of their positions and placed at other locations further out to the open sea (Skagerrak). German military forces held the fort until the capitulation in 1945.

Post-war 

Today there is a memorial of the fallen soldiers at the abandoned fort on top of the island.
In much of the post-war period, the fort on Odderøya served as a base and boot camp for the Norwegian Coastal Artillery. There is now a dedicated conservation plan for the many important objects of culture historical interest on the island.

Following the takeover of the municipality of Kristiansand, Odderøya has been used for varying cultural purposes and there has been broad agreement that the eastern and southern part will remain as untouched as possible. The quayside on the island's west side, however is under construction and will become residential area, intersected by new, artificial canals.

There are two current museum exhibitions on the island run by volunteers who show the military history of the fortress. Of which the photograph exhibition on the southern tip is open every Sunday.

East side of Odderøya 

On the island's east side was an important port and cargo space even before the settlements in the area had been named Kristiansand and was founded as a city. The site was suitable for loading lumber that could be floated on the river Torridalselva (Otra) and then loaded aboard a vessel for further transportation. In this part of Odderøya there are many abandoned cannon positions. A path leads up to the Mellombatteriet where protected cannons from the mid-20th century still are in the original positions. The Quarantine Wall, the wall that had been built to separate the local population from patients who were affected by diseases is still visible and has been restored. On the east side, there are rocks and beaches suitable for swimming spots, including “the cholera beach” and Bendiksbukta.

Silokaia and Kilden Performing Arts Centre on the west side 
On the west side, there are a quay harbor, warehouses, a grain and cement silo, and cleaning and tank farms. The port facilities, that in the summer are used mostly as a port for cruise ships, are part of the Kristiansand harbor. Grain Silo on pier 13 is designed by Sverre Aasland and Arne Korsmo for Christiansands Mills and is characterized as an "outstanding, independent and architectural work completed," and was awarded funds Houen diploma in 1939. The new Kilden Performing Arts Centre is built next door and was opened in 2012. Beside the parking garage behind Kilden, a staircase leads further up the island. The overdue grain silo has been decided to be rebuilt after an architectural competition, to contain a large art collection. The quayside is under construction to be transformed into a residential area.  There is also a huge indoor climbing park, Xland.

South of the harbor area is the steepest part of Odderøya. There is a strolling route down to the Odderøya Lighthouse from the western battery. The city's sewage treatment plant is located in a tunnel into the rock near the lighthouse.  There is also a staircase up and down from the lighthouse to the southern part of Odderøya. Strolling around these stairs is at your own risk, due to danger of rock fall.

Voluntary work and local conservation debate 

After the island was abandoned as a military area, it has to some extent been a local debate about the use of the island in the future.  There has been general agreement that the island's main older cultural heritage must be preserved. However, there has been a vigorous debate about the construction of roads, apartment buildings and commercial buildings, especially on the western side of the island.  The city council has debated how many of the buildings from the former fort should be preserved, as well as what can be demolished and replaced with more modern and beneficial buildings.  There are plans to refurbish, restore, and reopen the bunker underneath the gun emplacements containing the former command post on top of the island as a museum.

Many of the citizens have become involved in voluntary conservation work.  Odderøyas Venner is a voluntary association which organizes volunteer work and operates the cafè at the former watchman's residence on the southern tip of the island, offering refreshments on Sundays all year long from 11 am until 4 pm. In a former gunpowder house next to the cafe, there is a small museum exhibit illustrating the naval battle of Kristiansand on 9 April 1940.

Culture and tourism 
Odderøya is trying to establish itself as a regional cultural center. After the military activities were moved out, artists, galleries and filmmakers were established in the old barracks. Graphical printing on Odderøya is produced by renowned contemporary artists. The press in use was imported from Paris, and has been used by, among others, Pablo Picasso and Edvard Munch. In the marina Nodevika, a maritime museum with a museums marina are to be completed in 2015.

Many viewpoints offer a wonderful view over the bay and the entrance to the city. There are roe deer on the island, and a pond named Salamander Pond; there is also other wildlife. Near the island's highest point ( above sea level), there is al also a former bear den (last inhabited by bears in the 1700s). From the top of the island, there are outstanding views of the Kristiansandsfjorden, islands like Dvergsøya and Flekkerøy and the lighthouses Oksøy and Grønningen. Odderøya offers opportunities for recreation, walking in the woods, swimming and fishing from the rocks, despite the proximity to the city.  Some roads on the island are also accessible by wheelchair.

The Art Silo 
The former grain silo located next to the Kilden Performing Arts Centre is being turned into an art museum  for visual arts and adventure center. There has been a lot of local debate over whether it is the right use of public money to take care of the silo and redo it.

Odderøya Museum Harbor 
Odderøya Museum Harbor at Nodeviga Marina offers maritime activities and has a special focus on plastic boat's history and maritime activities in small boats after World War II. There are activities for children of various kinds.

Indoor climbing facilities 
Xland Adrenaline Park is open every day 10AM-10PM. Inside this indoor climbing center there are 110 different items, low and high-altitude obstacle trails, climbing walls, climbing grids, a zip-coaster, zip-lines, free fall-offs and more.  The facility is a new establishment from April 2019.

Indoor concert facilities 

Haubitz Hall Salongen is a lounge on the top of Odderøya that is used for smaller club concerts, with mostly local artists.  Haubitz Hall Salongen is inspired by American jazz / cabaret clubs of the 1940s, as well as from the house's own history as an officers' booth and later a cinema room for the former boot camp. It is renowned for its current unique atmosphere.

Haubitz Laaven was incorporated into the Haubitz Hall concept in the fall of 2017. It hosts concerts and other events with between 100 and 600 people. The building was built by the Germans in the summer of 1940. It is on the site where the former ammunition warehouse that was destroyed in the air attack on Odderøya was located.

Concert venue 

Parts of the Quart festival in 1992–2009 added Odderøya. Later, Odderøya has also been used as locations for live concerts.  There have been concerts in Bendiksbukta, on the lawn, Odden, a rebuilt sports ground,  and at a club in Odderøyhallen. In 2007, the sports ground was rebuilt with a new concert venue with an outdoor amphitheater, Odderøya Amphi, that has an audience capacity of 22,000.

On stage on Odderøya 
Many different kinds of bands and musicians have given outdoors live concerts on Odderøya over the years, including David Bowie, Bryan Adams, Nick Cave, Alice Cooper, Ozzy Osbourne, John Fogerty, Bob Dylan, Sting, Kanye West, No Doubt, Foo Fighters, Aerosmith, Daft Punk, Björk, Alicia Keys, Black Eyed Peas, Damian Marley, Backstreet Boys, Pink, Slash, Oasis, Snoop Dogg, 50 Cent, Ron Wood, The Who, Marilyn Manson, Muse and Coldplay.

Media gallery
Views from Odderøya.

Cannons
Views of the cannons on the island.

From the quarantine station

Haubitz Hall

See also 

Odderøya Lighthouse
History of Norway

References

External links 

Nature, history, culture and recreation at Odderøya (in Norwegian)
Odderøyas Venner Well-developed website from the voluntary association (in Norwegian)
HKH Kronprindsregent Frederiks Laug af 1788 Website from the voluntary association of Odder-Øe Fæstning (1667 – 1797) (in Norwegian)
The quarantine station at Odderøya  DigitaltMuseum VIDEO (in Norwegian)
The Haubitz Hall website (in Norwegian)
The German attack on Odderøya Fortress 9 April 1940 DigitaltMuseum VIDEO (in Norwegian)
Art and culture at Odderøya  www.visitnorway.com (in English)
Odderøya Fortress Agderkultur (in Norwegian/English)
Geocaching Odderøya Mellombatteriet (in Norwegian/English)

Geography of Kristiansand
Tourist attractions in Kristiansand
Fortifications of Kristiansand
Islands of Agder
Forts in Norway
World War II sites in Norway